was a Japanese Heian period courtier and bureaucrat, who held a number of positions over the course of his life. At one time or another, he was governor of the provinces of Harima, Bizen, Shinano, and Bitchū.

Yukihira was also a poet, many of his works being published alongside those of his brother, Narihira. He also established a school, called Shogaku-in, for the purpose of educating members of the Ariwara family.

His most famous poem, no. 16 in the Ogura Hyakunin Isshu is as follows:

Reference list

Bibliography 

818 births
893 deaths
Kuge
Ariwara clan
Japanese male poets
9th-century Japanese poets
Hyakunin Isshu poets